Biçer can refer to:

 Biçer, Dicle
 Biçer, Refahiye